The Fragile is the third studio album by American industrial rock band Nine Inch Nails, released as a double album by Nothing Records and Interscope Records on September 21, 1999. It was produced by Nine Inch Nails frontman Trent Reznor and English producer Alan Moulder, a longtime Reznor collaborator. It was recorded throughout 1997 to 1999 in New Orleans.

Looking to depart from the distorted production of their previous album, The Downward Spiral (1994), the album features elements of ambient and electronic music within a wide variety of genres. The album continues some of the lyrical themes from The Downward Spiral, including depression and drug abuse. The album notably contains more instrumental sections than their previous work, with some entire tracks being instrumentals. The Fragile is also one of the band's longest studio releases, clocking in at nearly 1 hour and 45 minutes long. The record was promoted with three singles: "The Day the World Went Away", "We're in This Together", and "Into the Void", as well as the promotional single "Starfuckers, Inc." and an accompanying tour, the Fragility Tour, which spanned two legs. Several accompanying recordings were also released, including a remix album, Things Falling Apart (2000), a live album, And All That Could Have Been (2002), as well as an alternate version of the record, The Fragile: Deviations 1 (2016).

Upon release, critics applauded the album's ambition and composition, although some criticized its length and perceived lack of lyrical substance. However, in the years following its release, it has come to be regarded by many critics and listeners to be among the band's best work, with some critics who initially gave the album negative reviews writing new reviews praising the album and its impact. Numerous musicians have cited the album's production as having an influence on how they approached the creation of their own work. The album debuted at number one in the U.S. to become the band's first chart-topper, and was eventually certified double platinum by the RIAA.

Writing and recording

The Fragile was produced by Trent Reznor and Alan Moulder at Nothing Studios in New Orleans. There were some personnel changes within Nine Inch Nails after the Self-Destruct tour, which saw drummer Chris Vrenna replaced by Bill Rieflin and Jerome Dillon, the latter of whom would become Nine Inch Nails' full-time drummer until late 2005. Charlie Clouser and Danny Lohner contributed occasional instrumentation and composition to several tracks although the album was predominantly written and performed by Reznor alone. The Fragile was mixed by Alan Moulder and mastered by Tom Baker. The packaging was created by David Carson and Rob Sheridan.

According to a February 2000 interview in Keyboard Magazine, two of the album's programmers, Charlie Clouser and Keith Hillbrandt, disclosed some synths used in the album's production, among them: Clavia Nord Lead 2, Waldorf Pulse and Microwave, Minimoog, Oberheim Xpander, Novation Bass Station, Sequential Circuits Prophet-VS, and the Access Virus.

Music and lyrics 
Over a year before the album's release, Reznor suggested – in what is presumed to be a deliberately misleading fashion – that the album would "be irritating to people because it's not traditional Nine Inch Nails. Think of the most ridiculous music you could ever imagine with nursery rhymes over the top of it. A bunch of pop songs."

In contrast to the heavily distorted instruments and gritty industrial sounds of their previous album, The Downward Spiral, The Fragile relies more on soundscapes, electronic beats, ambient noise, rock-laden guitar, and the usage of melodies as harmonies. Several critics noted that the album was seemingly influenced by progressive rock, art rock, electronica, and avant-garde music. It is categorized as an art rock album by The Rolling Stone Album Guide (2004), Edna Gundersen of USA Today, and Will Hermes of Entertainment Weekly. Hermes views that, like "art-rockers" King Crimson and David Bowie, Reznor incorporates elements of 20th-century classical music on the album, "mixing prepared piano melodies à la John Cage with thematic flavor from Claude Debussy". Music journalist Ann Powers observes elements of progressive rock bands King Crimson and Roxy Music, Reznor's influences, and the experimentation of electronica artists such as Autechre and Squarepusher, and writes that The Fragile uses funk bass lines, North African minor-key modalities, and the treatment of tonality by Symbolist composers like Debussy. The album also features several distorted guitar parts which Powers suggests that fans can enjoy. Rob Sheffield observes a "prog-rock vibe" akin to Pink Floyd's 1979 album The Wall and feels that The Fragile is similarly "a double album that vents ... alienation and misery into paranoid studio hallucinations, each track crammed with overdubs until there's no breathing room".

Described by Reznor as a sequel to The Downward Spiral—an album with a plot detailing the destruction of a man—The Fragile is a concept album dealing with his personal issues, including depression, angst, and drug abuse. His vocals, for the most part, are more melodic and somewhat softer, a departure from his harsh and often angry singing in previous works. However, several music critics including Reznor noticed the lack of lyrics on the album. The Bulletin interprets it as an industrial rock album about "fear and loathing that could compete with Pink Floyd's The Wall". In some ways, The Fragile is a response to The Downward Spiral. Reznor compared the lyrical content of the two albums:

The song "I'm Looking Forward to Joining You, Finally" is credited in the album's booklet as "for clara", suggesting that the song's topic, like "The Day the World Went Away", is about Reznor's grandmother, Clara Clark. 

Fight Club author Chuck Palahniuk singled out "The Wretched" for comment: "I remember being amazed when I first heard this... This wasn't just ennui: this was an active, aggressive, angry lack of caring. It's not 'Let's kill ourselves'; it's 'Let's kill each other'... It's not rock 'n' roll and it's not classical. It's something in between."

According to a CIA document entitled Guidelines for Interrogation Methods the song "Somewhat Damaged" was one of 13 songs played to detainees at Guantanamo Bay, supposedly as a means of torture.

Packaging

The cover artwork was designed by David Carson. A section within his book Fotografiks reveals that the top section of the album cover is from a photo of a waterfall and the bottom section is from a closeup photo of the inside of a seashell. Carson elaborated on this further in an image on his website:

Promotion
On September 10, 1998, at the 1998 MTV Video Music Awards, a thirty-second teaser trailer was shown on television to promote the then untitled album. It would be more than a year before the album was finally released.

The first single, "The Day the World Went Away", was released two months before the album.  "Into the Void" and "We're in This Together" proved to be the album's most successful singles.  The B-side "Starfuckers, Inc." was released on the album as a track at the last minute , and served as a promotional single for The Fragile.

In support of The Fragile, the Nine Inch Nails live band reformed for the Fragility tour.  The tour began in late 1999 and lasted until mid-2000, spanning Europe, Japan, New Zealand, Australia, and North America.  The tour consisted of two major legs, labeled Fragility 1.0 and Fragility 2.0.  The live band lineup remained largely the same from the previous tour in support of The Downward Spiral, featuring Robin Finck on guitar, Charlie Clouser on keyboards, and Danny Lohner on bass guitar.  Reznor held open auditions to find a new drummer, eventually picking then-unknown Jerome Dillon.

Nine Inch Nails' record label at the time, Interscope Records, reportedly refused to fund the promotional tour following The Fragile'''s lukewarm sales. Reznor instead committed to fund the entire tour himself, which quickly sold out. He concluded that "the reality is, I'm broke at the end of the tour", but also added, "I will never present a show that isn't fantastic."

The tour featured increasingly large production values, including a triptych video display created by contemporary video artist Bill Viola. Rolling Stone magazine named Fragility the best tour of 2000.

In 2002, the tour documentary And All That Could Have Been was released featuring performances from the Fragility 2.0 tour.  While making the DVD, Reznor commented on the tour in retrospect by saying "I thought the show was really, really good when we were doing it", but later wrote that "I can't watch it at all. I was sick for most of that tour and I really don't think it was Nine Inch Nails at its best."

Reissue
On September 21, 2009—the tenth anniversary of the album's release—a Nine Inch Nails official Twitter update hinted that a deluxe 5.1 surround audio reissue of The Fragile was in the works and was scheduled for a 2010 release.

During an interview with The New York Times that was broadcast on January 7, 2011, after questioned about the album Reznor explained:

While on tour in 2014 in Australia and New Zealand, Reznor was interviewed by a local reporter and was quoted about the reissue stating:

In June 2015, an instrumental version of the album was released to Apple Music. This version of the album also includes alternative versions of "The Frail", "Just Like You Imagined", "Pilgrimage", "La Mer", "The Mark Has Been Made", and "Complication", the instrumental version of "The Day the World Went Away (Quiet)", an extended version of "+Appendage", a demo version of "10 Miles High" called "Hello, Everything Is Not OK", and two previously unreleased tracks from The Fragile ("The March" and "Can I Stay Here?")

In 2017 a reissue of the vinyl version of The Fragile was released, alongside an expanded, instrumental version, titled The Fragile: Deviations 1. This version of The Fragile contains all songs in either instrumental or alternate formats, and combines them with newly released songs written and recorded during the sessions for The Fragile. Deviations 1 consists of a one-off 4×LP pressing.

Critical receptionThe Fragile received generally positive reviews from contemporary critics. Mojo called it "an impressively multi-textured, satisfyingly violent sonic workout", and Alternative Press found it "nothing short of astounding". Edna Gundersen of USA Today called it "meticulously honed and twisted to baffle, tantalize, disarm and challenge the listener", and wrote that "the coats of polish ... can't camouflage Trent Reznor's perverse and subversive paths to musical glory." Ann Powers of Spin called the album "a good old-fashioned strap-on-your-headphones experience". Jon Pareles of The New York Times wrote that, although he "doesn't approach suicide as he did on" The Downward Spiral, "Reznor can hide in the studio and piece together music that's as cunning, and disquieting, as his raw anger used to be." Will Hermes of Entertainment Weekly viewed that, even "if [Reznor's] emotional palette is limited, it remains broader than any of his metalhead peers", and that, "right now, hard rock simply doesn't get any smarter, harder, or more ambitious than this." Robert Hilburn of the Los Angeles Times wrote that, despite its length, "this is a profoundly challenging and moving work that strikes at the hollowness of most contemporary pop-rock with bullwhip force." The Guardians Adam Sweeting praised it as "a fearsomely accomplished mix of monster riffing, brooding melodies and patches of minimalist soul-searching". Rolling Stone writer Rob Sheffield felt that the album's "excess is Reznor's chosen shock tactic here, and what's especially shocking is how much action he packs into his digital via dolorosa."

In a negative review, Pitchforks Brent DiCrescenzo panned the album's lyrics as "overly melodramatic". John Aizlewood of Q felt that it is "let down by Reznor's refusal to trouble himself with melody and by some embarrassing lyrics". NMEs Victoria Segal panned its music as "background" and accused it of "chas[ing] 'crossover'", with "grey rock sleet masquerading as a storm beneath a haze of 'experimental' textures." Scott Seward of The Village Voice facetiously commended Reznor for "once again ... pioneering the marriage of heavy guitars, moody atmospherics, electronic drones and beats, and aggressive singing. Just like Killing Joke 20 years ago." Village Voice critic Robert Christgau was even less receptive: "After six fucking years, genius-by-acclamation Trent Reznor delivers double-hoohah, every second remixed till it glistens like broken glass on a prison wall. Is the way he takes his petty pain out on the world a little, er, immature for a guy who's pushing 35? Never mind, I'm told—just immerse in the music. So I do. 'Dream job: emperor,' it says. 'More fun than death by injection.'"The Fragile was included on several magazines' "end-of-year" album lists, including The Village Voice (number 14), Rolling Stone (number four), and Spin (number one). In a retrospective review, The Rolling Stone Album Guide (2004) gave it three-and-a-half out of five stars and wrote that, as "NIN's monumental double-disc bid for the art-rock crown, The Fragile sounds fantastic from start to finish, but there aren't enough memorable tunes underneath the alluring surfaces." AllMusic editor Stephen Thomas Erlewine offered similar criticism, writing that "Reznor's music is immaculately crafted and arranged, with every note and nuance gliding into the next — but he spent more time constructing surfaces than songs. Those surfaces can be enticing but since it's just surface, The Fragile winds up being vaguely unsatisfying." In 2005, The Fragile was ranked number 341 in Rock Hard magazine's book The 500 Greatest Rock & Metal Albums of All Time. But, even if initial reception was mixed, the album has gotten a cult following from Nine Inch Nails fans. In 2016, Exclaim! listed The Fragile at number two on their "Essential Albums" list for Nine Inch Nails, citing it as their most ambitious work and "a tragic if not stunning portrait of depression." Pitchfork would later reassess the album in their review of the album's 2017 "Definitive Edition", with a score change going from 2.0 to 8.7, describing it as Reznor's "magnum opus... The Fragile scrapes the sky like never before."

In Metal Hammer, it was named one of the 10 best industrial metal albums as well as one of the 20 best metal albums of 1999.

Commercial performanceThe Fragile debuted atop the Billboard 200 with first-week sales of 229,000 copies, earning the band their first number-one album on the chart. The album fell to number 16 the following week, becoming the largest drop from number one at the time. On January 4, 2000, the album was certified double platinum by the Recording Industry Association of America (RIAA), and by May 2005, it had sold 898,000 copies in the United States.

Steven Hyden of The A.V. Club writes that Reznor developed Nine Inch Nails from its role as a prominent rock act and by the time he finished recording The Fragile, alternative rock's overall popularity declined with several of Nine Inch Nails' contemporaries being disestablished or displaced by newer bands. Hyden also attributes the album's commercial performance to the rise of file-sharing on the Internet, which deviated from the alternative rock movement's emphasis on "fetishized vinyl" and "music festivals as peaceful places for young people to commune and dream of better futures."

Track listing
CD

Cassette
This release is identical to the CD pressing, with the exclusive addition of "+Appendage" attached to the end of "Please".

Vinyl / 2017 Definitive Edition
This release of The Fragile contains the songs "10 Miles High" and "The New Flesh" (both of which were later released as part of the "We're in This Together"  and "Into the Void" singles, dependent on territory.) "The Day the World Went Away", "The Wretched", "Even Deeper" and "La Mer" are all extended mixes, while the opening and closing of each side eliminates the crossfading between songs found on the CD and cassette versions, due to the nature of the vinyl medium. Finally, "Ripe" was shortened by removing the conclusive "(With Decay)" portion of the song. All of these changes made for the vinyl carry over to the Definitive Edition pressings, released digitally in 2016 and on vinyl in 2017.

The Fragile: Deviations 1The Fragile: Deviations 1 is an alternate version of The Fragile that contains all of the original songs in either instrumental or alternate forms, and combines them with newly released tracks written and recorded during the sessions for The Fragile. Deviations 1 consists of a one-off, limited edition four-LP pressing that was not made available on CD.

Critical reception
Neil Z. Yeung of AllMusic recommended that fans listen to and understand the original album first before delving into Deviations 1. Ultimately, he said that the release "serves as both a sonic time capsule and a reminder of one of NIN's most rewarding and underrated efforts." Writing for Pitchfork, Sean T. Collins found Deviations 1 interesting but simultaneously perplexing, saying "Far too many of Deviations freshly vocal-free songs sound like karaoke versions rather than instrumentals that can stand on their own. The result is a listening experience that outstays its welcome on a song-by-song basis, let alone over the course of its massive 150-minute running time."

Track listing

Personnel
Credits adapted from AllMusic, and The Fragile liner notes.Nine Inch Nails Trent Reznor – vocals, programming and production
 Charlie Clouser – keyboards, synthesizers, drum programming , additional sound design, atmospheres 
 Danny Lohner – drum programming , synthesizers (track 8), guitars 
 Jerome Dillon – drums Technical personnel Jeff Anderson – artist relations
 Emma Banks – booking agent
 David Carson – art direction, design and photography
 David 'Khan' Johnson – merchandising
 Alex Kochan – booking agent
 John Malm Jr. – management
 Ross Rosen – legal
 Susan Swan – publicityAdditional musicians and production personnel Steve Albini – engineering
 Tom Baker – mastering
 Adrian Belew – guitars 
 Clinton Bradley – programming, technical assistant to Bob Ezrin
 Paul Bradley – programming
 Paul DeCarli – programming
 Dr. Dre – additional production, mixing assistance 
 Steve Duda – production, programming and percussion , chorus , violin , additional sound design
 Bob Ezrin – additional production 
 Ken Friedman – additional sound design
 Mike Garson – piano 
 Toni Halliday – additional vocals
 Page Hamilton – guitar 
 Leo Herrera – engineering
 Dan Hill – additional vocals
 Keith Hillebrandt – programming and additional production , chorus , additional sound design
 Cherry Holly – trumpet 
 Denise Milfort – vocals 
 Alan Moulder –  production, engineering and mixing
 Dave Ogilvie – engineering
 Brian Pollack – engineering
 Kim Prevost – vocals 
 Porter Ricks – keyboards, programming and synthesizer
 Bill Rieflin – drums 
 Willie – cello Choirs' Buddha Debutante Choir :
 Heather Bennett
 Melissa Daigle
 Judy Miller
 Christine Parrish
 M. Gabriela Rivas
 Martha Wood
 Fae Young
 Choir :
 Di Coleman
 Tracy Hardin
 Gary L. Neal
 Traci Nelson
 Elquine L. Rice
 Terry L. Rice
 Rodney Sulton
 Stefani Taylor
 Barbara Wilson
 Leslie Wilson
 Buddha Boys Choir :
 Eric Edmonson
 Doug Idleman
 Marcus London
 Clint Mansell
 Adam Persaud
 Nick Scott
 Nigel Wiesehan

Charts

Weekly charts

Year-end charts

Certifications

See also
 List of Billboard 200 number-one albums of 1999

References

External links
 Album review at The A.V. Club Album review at The Washington Post''
 Playing God: The Fragile at Stylus Magazine

1999 albums
Albums produced by Alan Moulder
Albums produced by Trent Reznor
Art rock albums by American artists
Concept albums
Interscope Geffen A&M Records albums
Interscope Records albums
Nine Inch Nails albums
Nothing Records albums